Sri Anjaneyam is a 2004 Indian Telugu-language fantasy action film written, directed, and produced by Krishna Vamsi. It stars Nithiin, Arjun Sarja and Charmme Kaur. Pilla Prasad, Chandra Mohan, L. B. Sriram,  Prakash Raj and Ramya Krishna play supporting roles.  The music was composed by Mani Sharma.

The film released on 24 July 2004. It was dubbed into Tamil as Hanumaan (2004) and into Hindi as My Boss Bajarangbali (2004) and was also remade in Oriya as Chaati Chiri Dele Tu (2008).

Plot
Anji's (Nithiin) parents (Prakash Raj and Ramya Krishnan) are devotees of Lord Hanuman. Anji's father, being an engineer, dreams to develop his village by constructing a dam to irrigate the surrounding areas of the village. Unfortunately, he and his wife are murdered by the cruel village head Brahmam (Pilla Prasad) and his henchmen. Anji now becomes an orphan, and the village's Lord Rama temple's head-priest (Chandra Mohan) raises him as his own son. Anji naturally becomes a great devotee of Lord Hanuman and starts working as an assistant to the head-priest. He gradually becomes everyone's favorite and is loved by all the people in the village. Paddu (Charmy Kaur) too develops love on Anji over time and starts coming after him all the time. Now once again, the village head, with the support of a black magician (Pruthvi Raj), plans to kill Anji  to gain supernatural powers.

Lord Hanuman (Arjun) comes in disguise as a human to the temple and introduces himself with the name "Anji" to Anji (Nithiin). Anji (Nithiin) allows Anji (Arjun) to stay with him, and both become good friends in the process. Anji (Arjun) secures Anji (Nithiin) from the evil attacks every time and makes Anji (Nithiin) perform the final rites of his dead parents. However, this is watched by some villagers, and they get frightened, assuming Anji (Nithiin) to perform black magic. Many instances like this make the villagers believe that Anji (Nithiin) has unseen powers. Anji (Arjun) finally kills the black magician, who attempts to kill Anji (Nithiin) on behalf of the village head. When Anji (Nithiin) learns of this, he misunderstands the situation and tells Anji (Arjun) to go away. Anji (Arjun) tries to explain, but Anji (Nithiin) in rage tells the former to leave him.

Later, the village head, with the support and testimonies of some villagers of the instances which had Anji (Nithiin) doing unreal things, holds Anji (Nithiin) responsible for the death of the black magician and tries to kill him, claiming that he is performing black magic. But this is stopped by the head priest, who pleads the village head to not kill Anji (Nithiin) and asks him to just expel him out of the village as a punishment. Anji (Nithiin) gets expelled out of the village, but he does not care and comes again to the village. He is stopped by the villagers, but some of them start bowing down to Anji for the support he got from Lord Hanuman. Anji (Nithiin), unable to get their point, questions them and happens to realize that the Anji (Arjun) who has been with him all these days was not visible to any other villager except him. He even tells many instances which had Anji (Arjun) with him performing unreal things. But all the villagers say that they have not seen anyone with the name Anji beside Anji (Nithiin) all these days. Later, Anji (Nithiin) realizes through the head priest that the one with the name Anji (Arjun) who has been with him all the time was none other than Lord Hanuman. Anji (Nithiin) ultimately gets shocked and realizes his mistake. He hits his head with a brick in front of Lord Hanuman's statue out of remorse and falls unconscious. He witnesses Lord Hanuman instructing him to build the dam and name it as Seethamma Thalli Dam. Anji (Nithiin) starts doing so, but the village head once again tries to kill him. This time, Lord Hanuman helps Anji (Nithiin) and beats up the villains. Finally, Anji (Nithiin), with the help of the villagers, completes the dam, thereby fulfilling his parents' dream of constructing the dam.

Cast

 Nithiin as "Anji" Vemula Anjaneya
 Arjun Sarja as Anji (Lord Hanuman in human form)
 Charmy Kaur as Padmini "Paddu", Anji's love interest
 Pilla Prasad as Brahmam
 Chandra Mohan as Temple Priest
 Prakash Raj as Anji's father
 Ramya Krishna as Anji's mother 
 L. B. Sriram as Paddu's father
 Pruthviraj as Black Magician
 Subbaraju as Thadu gang leader
 Allari Subhashini
 Gautam Raju as a constable
 Ananth Babu as a lawyer Annayya
 Giridhar
 Vimalasri
 Tarzan Laxminarayana
 Jogi Krishnam Raju
 Jogi Naidu
 Lavanya

Soundtrack
The music was composed by Mani Sharma. Music was released on Maruthi Music Company. In a music review of the film, Sreya Sunil wrote that "Overall, Mani Sharma as extremely catchy tunes in this album".

Reception 
Jeevi of Idlebrain.com opined that "The film picks up the momentum from the scene where Arjun descends on to the earth. And the movie is entertaining and educating as long as Arjun is there in the film with him making Nitin do miracles and also the philosophical conversation with Nitin". A critic from Indiaglitz said that "Vamsi's main problem, as a director, is that he has tried to cram too many things in too small a canvas. The result is he is successful only in a few things". Mithun Verma of Full Hyderabad stated that "In short, only the Gods can rescue this movie. But there's not enough reason for them, too".

Noteslist

References

External links
 
 

2000s Telugu-language films
2004 films
Hindu devotional films
Films directed by Krishna Vamsi
Films scored by Mani Sharma
Telugu films remade in other languages